The Asociación de Periodistas de la Televisión y Radiofonía Argentina (APTRA) is an Argentine association of journalists, established in 1959. They give the Martín Fierro Awards each year, except in the 1976-1988 period.

References

Argentine journalism
Communications and media organisations based in Argentina
1959 establishments in Argentina